Belinchón is a municipality in Cuenca Province, Castile-La Mancha, central Spain.

Here the heir to the Castilian Crown, Sancho Alfónsez, was assassinated in a Moorish uprising on 29 May 1108.

References

External links

Municipalities in the Province of Cuenca